The 1947 Richmond Spiders football team was an American football team that represented the University of Richmond in the 1947 college football season. In its third and final season under head coach John Fenlon, the team compiled a 3–7 record (1–5 against conference opponents), finished in 15th place in the conference, and was outscored by a total of 189 to 106. The team played its home games at City Stadium in Richmond, Virginia.

Schedule

References

Richmond
Richmond Spiders football seasons
Richmond Spiders football